Evin Esen (May 11, 1949 – January 18, 2012) was a Turkish TV series and movie actress.

Early life
Esen was born on May 11, 1949, in Istanbul. He acted in TV series such as Çiçek Taksi and Tatlı Kaçıklar.
Finally, he played Şaziment in Akasya Durağı.
He died on January 18, 2012, as a result of a cerebral hemorrhage.

Personal life
Esen married Turkish actress Ümit Yesin in 1987. The couple divorced in 2011.

Death
Esen died on January 18, 2012, He died due to a brain hemorrhage. Evin Esen was bid farewell to his last journey on 19 January 2012 in Istanbul.

Filmography 

 Akasya Durağı -2008-2012
 Benim Annem Bir Melek -2008
 Aman Annem Görmesin -2008
 Baba Oluyorum - 2007
 Sardunya Sokağı -2007
 Bir Demet Tiyatro -2006
 Beşinci Boyut -2005
 Büyük Buluşma -2005, 2008
 Cennet Mahallesi -2004
 Yeni Hayat -2004
 Biz Boşanıyoruz -2004
 Beş Kollu Avize -2004
 Şöhretler Kebapçısı -2003
 Kara Gün -2003
 Yalanın Batsın  - 2002
 Yarım Elma - 2002
 Sırlar Dünyası -2002
 Üzgünüm Leyla -2000
 Marziye -1998
 Böyle mi Olacaktı? -1997
 Tatlı Kaçıklar - 1996
 Çiçek Taksi -1995
 Huzura Giden Yol - 1995
 Yazlıkçılar - 1993
 Hastane - 1993
 Kederli Yıllar - 1993
 Şaşkın Gelin - 1993
 Üç Aşağı Beş Yukarı -1992
 Ana - 1991
 Bir Milyara Bir Çocuk - 1990

References

External links
 

1949 births
2012 deaths
Actresses from Istanbul
Turkish film actresses
Turkish television actresses
21st-century Turkish actresses
20th-century Turkish actresses
Turkish actresses